Samantha Box (born 1977) is an American photographer. Box was born in Jamaica.

In 2012 Time Magazine profiled Box's ongoing project of photographing  Sylvia's Place, an emergency shelter for homeless LGBT youth in New York City. Her work is included in the collections of the Museum of Fine Arts, Houston
and Light Work, Syracuse, New York.

References

Living people
1977 births
20th-century American artists
21st-century American artists
20th-century American women photographers
20th-century American photographers
21st-century American women photographers
21st-century American photographers